John E. Burch (August 17, 1896 – July 28, 1969) was an American film assistant director and production manager during the latter part of the silent era through the 1950s.

Early life
Burch was born on August 17, 1896, in Chicago, Illinois to John Sebastian Burch and Mary Ann Pettit. Upon the United States' entry into World War One, Burch enlisted in the Navy, where he served aboard a submarine. At some point after the war, he moved from Chicago to Los Angeles, in an attempt to break into the film industry.

Career
Burch's first foray into the cinematic world was as an actor in 1925's White Fang, adapted by Jane Murfin from the novel of the same name by Jack London. This would be his only on-screen appearance. The following year, as the assistant director on The Arizona Streak (1926), would see him begin a long career behind the camera as an assistant director, production manager and supervisor. The remainder of the 1920s would see him continue in the role of assistant director, as well as prop manager.

In 1931 Burch was credited as supervisor on Fanny Foley Herself.  It was only the second film shot in the new Technicolor process. Over the course of his career, Burch would be involved in over 65 films. Some of the more notable films he worked on include: Li'l Abner (1940), where he was an assistant director for Albert S. Rogell; 1942's A Guy Named Joe, starring Spencer Tracy and Irene Dunne, on which he would be one of Victor Fleming's assistant directors; and Brewster's Millions (1945), starring Dennis O'Keefe, and directed by Allen Dwan, assisted by Burch. In 1936, Burch would be one of the early members of the Directors Guild of America. His final work in film would be on 1958's Thunder Road, starring Robert Mitchum, on which he worked as the production manager. After leaving the film industry, Burch would work for a short time in television, doing a few episodes for shows like The Untouchables, before working steadily as an assistant director on Bonanza from 1960 to 1962.

Burch died from pneumonia on July 28, 1969, in Honolulu, Hawaii.

Filmography
(as per AFI's database)

References

External links
 
 

People from Chicago
1896 births
1969 deaths
American male silent film actors
20th-century American male actors